Pir Mehr Ali Shah Arid Agriculture University, Rawalpindi (PMAS-Arid University) is in Rawalpindi, Punjab, Pakistan. It is named after Pir Meher Ali Shah, a known Hanafi scholar.

The university is ranked at No. 2 in Agriculture/Veterinary category as per the Higher Education Commission of Pakistan and 7th overall in ranking of universities in Pakistan. 

Arid Agriculture University offers degree programmes leading to Bachelor, Master and Ph.D. in disciplines including Food Science & Technology, Computer Sciences, Management Sciences, Pure Sciences, Agriculture,Agricultural Engineering, Veterinary & Animal Sciences, Social Sciences and other Arts and Fine Arts programs.

History
In the 1970s, the government of Punjab established an agricultural college in Rawalpindi for the development of rain-fed agriculture. The college was upgraded to the level of university in 1994.

The Pir Mehr Ali Shah Arid Agriculture University is named after Chishti Sufi saint Pir Mehr Ali Shah.
The University is now working on two mega projects titled DDSDP and ENCIB. There is a centre for precision agriculture and national centre for industrial biotechnology. The VC Prof. Qamar uz zaman is a visionary leader having special interests on commercialization of developed research projects for the benefit of the country.

Academics
AAUR teaches courses in five faculties, six institutes and one National center (as well as joint programs with other institutions):
 Faculty of Crop and Food Sciences
Institute of Food and Nutritional Sciences
 Faculty of Sciences
 Faculty of Agricultural Engineering and Technology
 Faculty of Social Sciences 
 Faculty of Veterinary & Animal Sciences (with departments in Animal Sciences, Veterinary Basic Science, Patho-Biology, Clinical Studies and Poultry Science) 85 students
 Institute of Education and Research
 University Institute of Management Sciences
 University Institute of Information Technology
 University Institute of Biochemistry & Biotechnology (UIBB)
 Faculty of Agriculture Engineering
 Institute of Geo-informatics and Earth Observation (IGEO)
 Institute of Soil and Environmental Sciences (ISES)

See also
arid-zone agriculture
International Center for Agricultural Research in the Dry Areas
xeriscaping
xerophyte
Barani Institute of Information Technology
Barani Institute of Sciences

References

External links
University of Arid Agriculture, Rawalpindi website

Universities and colleges in Rawalpindi District
Educational institutions established in 1994
1994 establishments in Pakistan
Public universities and colleges in Punjab, Pakistan
Agricultural universities and colleges in Pakistan